Gerlachov is a village and municipality in Bardejov District in the Prešov Region of north-east Slovakia.

History
In historical records the village was first mentioned in 1326.

The name is derived from the Germanic name Gerlach with Slavic suffix -ov.

Geography
The municipality lies at an altitude of 360 metres and covers an area of 8.864 km².
It has a population of about 1020 people, 48.5% of whom are Greek Catholic and 42.7% are Eastern Orthodox.

Genealogical resources

The records for genealogical research are available at the state archive "Statny Archiv in Levoca, Presov, Slovakia"

 Roman Catholic church records (births/marriages/deaths): 1792-1899 (parish B)
 Greek Catholic church records (births/marriages/deaths): 1769-1896 (parish B)
 Lutheran church records (births/marriages/deaths): 1710-1895 (parish B)

See also
 List of municipalities and towns in Slovakia

References

External links
 
 
Surnames of living people in Gerlachov

Villages and municipalities in Bardejov District
Šariš